Legio I Iovia ( First Legion "Jovian", "devoted to Jupiter") was a Roman legion, levied by Emperor Diocletian (284–305), possibly together with II Herculia, to guard the newly created province of Scythia Minor. The cognomen of this legion came from Diocletian's attribute Iovianus, "similar to Jupiter". According to Notitia Dignitatum, at the beginning of the 5th century I Iovia was still in its camp on the Danube. The legion may have even survived the fall of Rome and continued to serve the Byzantine empire.

See also
List of Roman legions

References 

01 Iovia
Military units and formations established in the 3rd century